The Nissan Diesel UA (kana:日産ディーゼル・UA) was a full-size single-decker bus produced by the Japanese manufacturer Nissan Diesel for 32 years of production from 1973 until 2005. It can be built as either a bus chassis or an integral bus. Competitors of the UA include the Isuzu Cubic, Mitsubishi Fuso Aero Star and the Hino Blue Ribbon.

U/UA (1973-1990) 
U/UA20/30 (1973)
U35 (1975)
K-U/UA31/36 (1980)
P-U/UA32 (1984)
P-U/UA33/50 (1988)

UA (1990-2005) 
One-step and Two-step
U-UA440/510/520 (1990)
KC-UA460/521 (1995)
KC-UA460HANkai (ERIP Hybrid, 1995)
NE-UA4E0 (CNG, 1996)
KL-UA452 (2000)

Non-step

The Nissan Diesel UA Non-step is considered as one of the low floor variants, sometimes in other parts of Japan, it is known as a low entry variant. Other low floor models include the Space Runner RA and the Space Runner RM.

F type
UA460KAM (1997)
KC-UA460KAM (1998)
KL-UA272KAM (2000)
N type
KL-UA272KAM (2003)
G type
KC-UA460 (2000)
KL-UA452 (2000)

See also 
Other Nissan Diesel low-floor (non-step) bus models sold in Japan:
 Nissan Diesel Space Runner A
 Nissan Diesel Space Runner RA
 Nissan Diesel Space Runner RM

References 

Bus chassis
Hybrid electric buses
Low-floor buses
Low-entry buses
Step-entrance buses
Buses of Japan
UA
UD trucks
Full-size buses
Vehicles introduced in 1973